Lynx Melody (1975–2004) was an American Quarter Horse mare who was a National Cutting Horse Association (NCHA) World Champion in 1980 as well as winning both the NCHA Derby and Futurity. She was inducted into the American Quarter Horse Association's (AQHA) Hall of Fame in 2008.

Life

Lynx Melody was a sorrel, foaled in 1975. She won the 1978 NCHA Futurity, as well as the 1979 NCHA Derby. In 1980 she was named the NCHA World Champion Mare. Her lifetime NCHA earnings were $113,681.00. She died in September 2004.

Pedigree

Notes

References

External links
 All Breed Pedigree Database pedigree of Lynx Melody

American Quarter Horse broodmares
Cutting horses
1975 animal births
2004 animal deaths
AQHA Hall of Fame (horses)